Vita Kuktienė (born 6 August 1980) is a Lithuanian basketball small forward. She competed for Lithuania in all major European tournaments since 2001 and took part in the 2002 and 2006 world championships.

References

1980 births
Living people
Lithuanian women's basketball players
Small forwards